Penleigh and Essendon Grammar School (abbreviated as PEGS) is a multi-campus independent Uniting Church comprehensive co-educational early learning, primary and secondary day school, with three campuses located in Melbourne, Victoria, Australia. The school is the product of an amalgamation of two schools, Penleigh Presbyterian Ladies' College and Essendon Grammar School, which was completed in 1977. Uniforms were different for boys and girls until Term 3 2020 when a new combined school uniform was launched. The school's campuses are located in Essendon, Moonee Ponds and Keilor East.

The school is a member of the Associated Grammar Schools of Victoria and competes against the other member schools in a range of sports.

History
The history of Penleigh and Essendon Grammar School is the history of two schools, Penleigh Ladies' College and Essendon Grammar School. Each of these schools has its origins in the early years of Melbourne.

Carlton College, St Thomas' Grammar School, and Northern Grammar School
Carlton College opened in 1872 and this school occupied several premises in the Parkville area. This school combined with St Thomas' Grammar in 1910, when they moved to a larger property in Essendon. Northern Grammar School commenced its operation in 1921 in the Moonee Ponds area but soon moved to new premises on the site of St. John's Church in Essendon.  In 1924, the school acquired the present site at 59 Raleigh Street, Essendon.

Essendon Grammar School
Essendon Grammar School was established in 1934 following the amalgamation of Northern Grammar School and St. Thomas' Grammar School.

In 1948, Essendon Grammar School began its affiliation with the Presbyterian Church. The site of the senior school in Keilor East was purchased in 1956 and this new campus of the school was officially opened by the Prime Minister of Australia, Robert Menzies, in 1960. In 1968, the Old Essendon Grammarians Football Club was formed by the school's alumni.

Penleigh Ladies' College
Penleigh was originally established in 1871 as Dorset House, Mrs. Tulloch's School for Young Ladies. The school occupied several sites in the Moonee Ponds area. The school developed and expanded particularly under the guidance of the Limerock sisters, Lilian Mary Limerock (1883-1969), Elma Vivian Limerock (1888-1964), and Elizabeth Muriel Limerock (1892-1973).

The school was renamed Penleigh Ladies' College during the First World War and it moved to the present site at 83 Park Street, Moonee Ponds in 1921. After the Second World War Penleigh was purchased from the Limerock sisters by the Presbyterian Church.

Co-operation and amalgamation
The first links between Essendon Grammar School and Penleigh Ladies' College were established in 1952 when Intermediate and Leaving students participated in some common classes. By 1969, the councils of the two schools agreed to integrate the two schools at the senior levels. In 1973, the co-educational senior college, McNab House, was established on the Keilor East site. The two schools were amalgamated in 1977 to form Penleigh and Essendon Grammar School; the school also connected with the Uniting Church when it came into existence in 1977 and became an incorporated body in 1982. In the following year, the school purchased property at Lake Eildon to develop an Outdoor Education Programme.

In 2010 the school commenced a substantial, multi-campus redevelopment to run over several years. These included the new senior campus called the Infinity Centre which was renamed to the Larkin Centre in 2019 in celebration of retiring principal Tony Larkin, and a redeveloped middle school boys campus called Gottliebsen house, named after Robert Gottliebsen, and the girls campus called McNab house, named after Claire McNab, which opened in 2013 and 2014 respectively.

Sport 
PEGS is a member of the Associated Grammar Schools of Victoria (AGSV).

AGSV & AGSV/APS premierships 
PEGS has won the following AGSV & AGSV/APS premierships.

Boys:

 Badminton - 2002
 Cricket (3) - 2010, 2018, 2020
 Football (13) - 1977, 1991, 1993, 1994, 1995, 1998, 2006, 2007, 2010, 2011, 2013, 2018, 2019
 Hockey (2) - 1990, 2017
 Soccer (13) - 1991, 1994, 1996, 1998, 2002, 2007, 2010, 2013, 2016, 2017, 2019, 2021, 2022
 Squash - 2004
 Table Tennis - 2014
 Tennis (8) - 1990, 1991, 1995, 1997, 2015, 2017, 2018, 2019

Girls:

 Athletics (8) - 1995, 1996, 1997, 1998, 1999, 2000, 2001, 2009
Badminton - 2021
 Basketball (3) - 2004, 2011, 2012
 Cross Country (4) - 1995, 1996, 1997, 2009
 Netball - 2010
Soccer - 2021
 Softball - 2019
 Swimming (9) - 1995, 1996, 1997, 1998, 1999, 2000, 2003, 2004, 2009 (Girls) 
 Tennis (2) - 2018, 2020
 Volleyball - 2006

Notable alumni
 Eric Bana – actor
 Shannon Bennett – Australian chef/restaurateur and founder of the Vue du Monde restaurant
 Trent Cotchin – AFL Richmond player
 Zac Dawson – AFL Fremantle and Hawthorn
 Corey Ellis- AFL Footballer
 Thomas Faulkner – String theory professor (Class of 1999)
 Dustin Fletcher – AFL Essendon player and father, Ken Fletcher former AFL Essendon player
 Cyril Gove — Victorian Football League (VFL) footballer with Essendon Football Club and amateur jockey
 Robert Gottliebsen – Journalist and business commentator, founder of ‘’Business Review Weekly‘’ magazine
 Hanna Griffiths – Actor & Film Producer
 Andre Haermeyer – Australian Labor Party - Member of Victorian Legislative Assembly 1992-2008
 Joan Kirner – first female Premier of Victoria (also attended University High School)
 Herbert Larkin — Australian flying ace (First World War) and pioneer aviator
 Jayden Laverde – AFL Essendon Football Club
 Andrej Lemanis – head coach of the Australian men's national basketball team
 Brett McLeod – newsreader with National Nine News
 Jake Melksham – AFL, Melbourne Football Club
 Jason Moran (criminal)
 Rick Olarenshaw – former AFL Essendon and Collingwood player
 Cameron Rayner – AFL footballer, Brisbane Lions
 Barak Sopé – Former Prime Minister of Vanuatu
 Cameron Stevenson – Cricketer, Melbourne Renegades, Tasmania Tigers
 Curtis Stone – chef and restaurateur
 Curtis Taylor (Australian footballer)- AFL Footballer
 Kelvin Thomson – Labor Party Member for Wills
 Madge Titheradge and sister, Lily Titheradge – stage and film actresses
 Joshua Toy – AFL Gold Coast Suns
 Jackson Trengove- AFL Footballer
 David Tweed – share market opportunist
 Daniel Venables – AFL footballer with the West Coast Eagles
 Matthew Watson – AFL Carlton player
 Scott West – AFL Western Bulldogs player
 Linden Hall- Olympian
 Elizabeth Watson (netball)

References

External links
 Penleigh and Essendon Grammar School website

Private secondary schools in Melbourne
Private primary schools in Melbourne
Essendon, Victoria
Associated Grammar Schools of Victoria
Rock Eisteddfod Challenge participants
Junior School Heads Association of Australia Member Schools
Presbyterian schools in Australia
Uniting Church schools in Australia
Buildings and structures in the City of Moonee Valley
Penleigh and Essendon Grammar School